Croftnacreich is a hamlet on the Black Isle, in Ross and Cromarty in the Highland council area of Scotland.

References

Populated places on the Black Isle